Kolten Solomon (born July 16, 1989) is a former professional Canadian football wide receiver. He was attended the Saskatchewan Roughriders' 2011 training camp but, following a training camp injury, he was released. After the completion of his junior career in 2011, Solomon signed with Saskatchewan on December 11, 2011. He was later released on May 11, 2012 and joined the Regina Rams of the CIS. He re-signed with the Roughriders on December 19, 2012. He played junior football for the Regina Thunder of the Canadian Junior Football League from 2009-2011.

On April 19, 2013, Solomon was released a second time by the Riders.

References

External links
Saskatchewan Roughriders bio

1989 births
Living people
Canadian football wide receivers
Sportspeople from Regina, Saskatchewan
Players of Canadian football from Saskatchewan
Regina Rams players
Canadian Junior Football League players
Saskatchewan Roughriders players